This is an episode list of the British sitcom Steptoe and Son. All episodes were originally shown on what is now known as BBC One, although the station was simply called BBC Television until April 1964 when BBC2 began broadcasting (between the third and fourth series). Dates shown are the original broadcast dates. Series 1–4 were produced in black and white, and series 5–8 in colour. However, the series 5 episodes, and all but two of series 6, only survive in black and white.

Series 1–6 were produced and directed by Duncan Wood, series 7 by John Howard Davies (apart from "Divided We Stand" which was directed by David Croft as Davies was ill), the 1973 Christmas Special by Graeme Muir, and series 8 and 1974 Christmas Special by Douglas Argent (with "The Seven Steptoerai" being co-directed by Mike Crisp). All episodes were written by Ray Galton and Alan Simpson. Series 7–8 are regularly repeated on Gold.

Series overview

Series 1 (1962)

Series 2 (1963)

Series 3 (1964)

Series 4 (1965)
The first series where the creator's names came before the actor's name in the opening titles but still saying "By Alan Simpson and Ray Galton"

Series 5 (1970)
Produced in colour, but all currently only exist in black and white. Now with the "By Ray Galton and Alan Simpson" byline at the beginning.

Series 6 (1970)
Second series produced in colour. With two episodes excepted (indicated), this series now only exists in black and white.

Series 7 (1972–73)
Produced in colour. This is the first series to survive completely in colour.

Series 8 (1974)

Christmas Night with the Stars
Christmas Night with the Stars was screened annually on Christmas night when the top stars of the BBC appeared in short versions, typically five to ten minutes; The programme ran from 1958 to 1972 and Steptoe & Son appeared twice in 1962 and 1967.

However the 1962 Christmas segment no longer exists. Only sequences from the 1967 Christmas segment remain and still exist on the original film in the archives. An audio recording for the 1967 sketch exists.

Radio series
Between 1966 and 1976, 52 episodes of Steptoe and Son were adapted for radio, these were remakes of the TV episodes specifically tailored for a radio audience, (Note:they are not TV soundtrack recordings), Series 1 & 2 were broadcast on the BBC Light Programme in 1966 and 1967. Series 3-6 and a final Christmas Special were broadcast on BBC Radio 2 between 1971 and 1976.

 Series 1 & 2 TV scripts adapted for Radio by Gale Pedrick.
 Series 3-6 & Christmas Special TV scripts adapted for radio by Ray Galton and Alan Simpson.
 All radio episodes produced by Bobby Jaye.

Series 1
1 The Offer (3 July 1966)
2 The Bird (10 July 1966)
3 65-Today (17 July 1966)
4 The Stepmother (24 July 1966)
5 The Economist (31 July 1966)
6 Wallah-Wallah Catsmeat (7 August 1966)
7 The Diploma (14 August 1966)
8 Steptoe ala Carte (21 August 1966)
9 The Holiday (28 August 1966)
10 The Bath (4 September 1966)
11 The Lead Man Cometh (11 September 1966)
12 The Musical Evening (18 September 1966)
13 The Bonds That Bind Us (25 September 1966)

Series 2
1/ The Siege of Steptoe Street (11 June 1967)
2/ Pilgrim's Progress (18 June 1967)
3/ The Wooden Overcoats (25 June 1967)
4/ Sunday for Seven Days (2 July 1967)
5/ The Piano (9 July 1967)
6/ My Old Man's a Tory (16 July 1967)
7/ Homes Fit for Heroes (23 July 1967)
8/ Crossed Swords (30 July 1967)

Series 3
1/ A Death in the Family (21 March 1971)
2/ Two's Company (28 March 1971)
3/ Tea for Two (4 April 1971)
4/ T.B. Or Not T.B. (11 April 1971)
5/ Without Prejudice (18 April 1971)
6/ Cuckoo in the Nest (25 April 1971)
7/ Steptoe and Son -and Son (2 May 1971)
8/ Robbery with Violence (9 May 1971)

Series 4
1/ Full House(30 January 1972)
2/ Is That Your Horse Outside?  (6 February 1972)
3/ The Lodger (13 February 1972)
4/ A Box in Town (20 February 1972)
5/ The Three Feathers (27 February 1972)
6/ The Colour Problem (5 March 1972)
7/ And Afterwards At...  (12 March 1972)
8/ Any Old Iron (19 March 1972)

Series 5
1/ The Desperate Hours (26 May 1974)
2/ Come Dancing (2 June 1974)
3/ A Star is Born (9 June 1974)
4/ A Winter's Tale (16 June 1974)
5/ Men of Property (23 June 1974)
6/ Men of Letters (30 June 1974)

Series 6 and Christmas special
1/ Loathe Story (8 February 1976)
2/ Oh What a Beautiful Mourning (15 February 1976)
3/ Live Now P.A.Y.E. Later (22 February 1976)
4/ Upstairs Downstairs, Upstairs Downstairs (29 February 1976)
5/ And So to Bed (7 March 1976)
6/ Porn Yesterday (14 March 1976)
7/ The Seven Steptoerai (21 March 1976)
8/ Seance in a Wet Rag and Bone Yard (28 March 1976)
 "Away for Christmas"  (25 December 1976) (based on 1974 TV Xmas Special)

Other

When Steptoe Met Son (2002)

The Curse of Steptoe (2008)

Steptoe and son in Murder at Oil Drum Lane (2005)

References

External links
 
 
 

Steptoe and Son episodes
Steptoe and Son episodes
Episodes